Clare Julia Hawes (born 10 February 1976), known professionally as Keeley Hawes, is an English actress. After beginning her career in a number of literary adaptations, including Our Mutual Friend (1998) and Tipping the Velvet (2002), Hawes rose to fame for her portrayal of Zoe Reynolds in the BBC series Spooks (2002–2004), followed by her co-lead performance as DI Alex Drake in Ashes to Ashes (2008–2010). She is also known for her roles in Jed Mercurio's Line of Duty as DI Lindsay Denton (2014–2016) and in BBC One drama Bodyguard (2018) in which she played Home Secretary Julia Montague. Hawes is a three-time BAFTA TV Award nominee, having been nominated for the British Academy Television Award for Best Actress for her roles as Lindsay Denton and Julia Montague, and a British Academy Television Award for Best Supporting Actress for her role as Dorothy Wick in the drama Mrs Wilson.

Hawes has had leading roles in the 2010 revival of Upstairs, Downstairs, the limited series The Casual Vacancy (2015), The Missing (2016), the ITV comedy-drama The Durrells (2016–2019), the Russell T Davies drama serial It's a Sin (2021) and in The Midwich Cuckoos (2022). She has also acted as an executive producer on ITV drama Honour (2020) and comedy-drama  Finding Alice (2021), starring in them both.

Hawes has appeared in films, including Death at a Funeral (2007), High-Rise (2015), Misbehaviour (2020) and To Olivia (2021), in which she portrays actress Patricia Neal. She has also provided the voice of Lara Croft in Tomb Raider video games, including Tomb Raider: Legend, Tomb Raider: Anniversary, Tomb Raider: Underworld, and Lara Croft and the Guardian of Light.

Early life 
Hawes was born at St Mary's Hospital, London, and grew up in a council flat in Marylebone. She is the youngest of four children. Hawes attended Sylvia Young Theatre School where she became friends with singer Emma Bunton and actress Kellie Bright. In her teenage years she worked in various part-time jobs including at a casino, Sainsbury's and McDonald’s. While in sixth form she was approached in Oxford Street by a modelling scout and signed up by Select Model Management. After numerous features for teen magazine Shout, Hawes became a fashion intern for Cosmopolitan. During this period, she was first asked to audition for a film. We're not an acting family, but my parents have always encouraged me. I'm sure my dad spreads the word about my programmes to everyone who gets in his cab, which must help the ratings!

Career 
Hawes first came into the public eye in the 1990s, having supporting roles in Troublemakers, Dennis Potter's Karaoke (1995), Heartbeat (1995) and The Beggar Bride (1997). Hawes' first film role was in the 1998 film  The Avengers, in which she played Tamara.

Hawes appeared in several BBC adaptations of classic and modern literature, including Our Mutual Friend (1998), Wives and Daughters (1999) and as the young Diana Dors in the biopic The Blonde Bombshell (1999).

In the late 1990s, Hawes featured in at least four music videos, for the singles "Saturday Night" by Suede, "Marvellous" by The Lightning Seeds, "Come Around" by The Mutton Birds, and "She's a Star" by James.

In 2002, Hawes appeared in Tipping the Velvet. From 2002 to 2004, she appeared as Zoe Reynolds in the spy drama series Spooks. In 2003, she appeared in the BBC's re-telling of The Canterbury Tales. In 2006, Hawes replaced Jonell Elliott as the voice of Lara Croft in the action-adventure video game, Tomb Raider: Legend. She appeared as Rosie in the British comedy The Vicar of Dibley from 2006 to 2007.  Also in 2007, Hawes appeared as Jane in the comedy Death at a Funeral.  She reprised her voiceover role as Lara Croft in the video games Tomb Raider: Anniversary, a remake of the original Tomb Raider, released in 2007, followed by 2008's Tomb Raider: Underworld.

In April 2008, Hawes began filming the BBC drama Mutual Friends, and appeared in That Mitchell and Webb Look. From 2008 to 2010, she appeared in Ashes to Ashes, the spin-off from the hit BBC series Life on Mars, as Alex Drake, a police officer in London's Metropolitan Police. For her portrayal of Alex Drake, Hawes was granted the Best UK Television Actress Award in 2008 by the Glamour Awards.

In 2009, Hawes portrayed Detective Superintendent Martha Lawson in a six-episode ITV series, Identity.  The 2010 release of the isometric Tomb Raider spin-off game, Lara Croft and the Guardian of Light, again featured Hawes as the voice of Lara Croft. In December of that year, she starred as Lady Agnes Holland in the three-episode relaunch of Upstairs, Downstairs.

On 25 April 2011, Hawes narrated the documentary Kate and William: A Royal Love Story on BBC One, prior to the wedding of Prince William and Kate Middleton. That June, she also narrated the ITV1 documentary Four of a Kind as part of ITV's Extraordinary Families season. 

Hawes appeared as Catherine Mundi in 2014's fantasy adventure film Mariah Mundi and the Midas Box. She also guest-starred in 2014 as Ms. Delphox in the eighth series of Doctor Who, and returned as Lara Croft in the voiceover role for that year's release of the game Lara Croft and the Temple of Osiris. Her performance as Detective Inspector Lindsay Denton in the BBC Two drama Line of Duty (2014–2016), was described in The Daily Telegraph as "the performance of 2014," and garnered her a nomination for the BAFTA TV Award for Best Actress. 

From 2016 to 2019, Hawes played the main role of Louisa Durrell in ITV's popular comedy-drama The Durrells. She appeared in 2018's TV series Bodyguard, in which she played Home Secretary Julia Montague, and was nominated for a BAFTA for the role.  Also in 2018, Hawes also played Dorothy Wick in Mrs Wilson, opposite Iain Glen. Hawes came in at number 38 on the 2018 Radio Times TV 100 list, determined by television executives and broadcasting veterans. She has since appeared in Traitors and Summer of Rockets, both in 2019. 

Hawes later played Detective Chief Inspector Caroline Goode in the 2020 miniseries Honour which was based on the real life murder of Banaz Mahmod. Hawes' portrayal was applauded by The Guardian. She also appeared in the films Misbehaviour and Rebecca that year. In 2021, Hawes co-created, served as an executive producer and starred in the ITV comedy-drama  Finding Alice as Alice Dillion. It was later announced that there would be a second series.
In 2021, Hawes appeared in the Russell T. Davis five-part drama It's a Sin as Valerie Tozer. The series follows five 18-year-olds who move to London in 1981 and have their lives turned upside down by the AIDS crisis. It aired on Channel 4 and on HBO Max in the United States. Critics and viewers described her performance in the final episode as "outstanding and magnificent" and a "masterclass". Similarly, the Radio Times described her performance as "stunning" and "heartbreaking". Critics and viewers also expressed their desire for Hawes to win BAFTAs for her performance. The following month, Hawes appeared as actress Patricia Neal in 2021 film To Olivia, which revolves around her marriage to Roald Dahl and the death of their daughter.

In June 2022, Hawes appeared in a leading role as Dr. Susannah Zellaby in Sky Max science fiction horror drama The Midwich Cuckoos based on the novel of the same name.

Philanthropy 
Hawes began working with UNICEF in 2012; in 2017 she became a UNICEF ambassador. Her main focus has been visiting Syrian refugee children and families living in the Za’atari refugee camp and host communities in Amman.

Personal life 
Hawes married the disc jockey Spencer McCallum in December 2001 when their son Myles was almost two years old; they divorced in 2004. She married Matthew Macfadyen, her co-star in Spooks, in November 2004 and their daughter was born the following month. Their second child was born in September 2006.

Filmography

Film

Television

Theatre

Video games

Awards and nominations

References

External links 

 
 Keeley Hawes (interview) - BBC Spooks
 Keeley Hawes Interview - Ashes to Ashes, Sky UK

Living people
1976 births
20th-century English actresses
21st-century English actresses
Actresses from London
Alumni of the Sylvia Young Theatre School
English child actresses
English female models
English film actresses
English stage actresses
English television actresses
English video game actresses
English voice actresses
People from Marylebone
Select Model Management models